Ian McBryde is an Australian poet. He was born in 1953 in Toronto, Ontario, Canada but has been a long time Australian resident. He has published ten books of poems and three audio CDs of spoken word poetry and original music  A widely admired poet in Australia his most recent, and tenth book, a new and selected publication, was highly anticipated by his contemporaries. We the Mapless: new and selected poems was launched in Melbourne, Australia, at Collected Works Bookshop in February 2017  and at The Queensland Poetry Festival at the Judith Wright Centre for Contemporary Arts in August, 2017.

Career
In addition to writing poetry, McBryde has also painted and sketched, and spent time as a drummer in progressive jazz-rock bands.

McBryde's 2005 book ' Slivers' consists entirely of Monostich style poems that attempt to relate  a whole poem in one line.

Bibliography

Books
 The Shade of Angels, 1990 
 The Familiar, 1994, Hale and Iremonger
 Flank, (book with enclosed CD) 1998, Eaglemont Press.
 Equatorial, 2001 
 Ground Floor, 2002 
 Ambulance : and other poems, 2003, Picara Press 
 Domain, 2004, Five Islands Press
 Slivers, 2005, Flat Chat Press
The Adoption Order, 2009 Five Islands Press
We the Mapless: New and Selected Poems, 2017 Bareknuckle Books

Audio CDs
 At Land's End
 The Still Company

Awards 
 The Age Poetry Book of the Year, 2005: Domain (shortlisted)

See also
 The bibliography of Australian literature edited by John Arnold, John Hay, Sally Batten, Kerry Kilner, Terence O'Neill, University of Queensland Press, 2008,  (see page 348)
Monostich

References

External links

 David Prater interviews Ian McBryde
 Ali Alizadeh Reviews Ian McBryde and Tim Sinclair
McBryde website
Examples of McBryde's monostich , whole poems in one line
Example of other McBryde poetry
National Library of Australia Catalogue for this author

1953 births
Australian poets
Canadian emigrants to Australia
Living people
Writers from Toronto